Dol is a small village in the Municipality of Medvode in the Upper Carniola region of Slovenia.

Church

The local church is dedicated to Archangel Michael.

References

External links 

Dol on Geopedia

Populated places in the Municipality of Medvode